Orai Railway Station is a railway station on Jhansi–Kanpur rail line of North Central Railway in Jalaun district, Uttar Pradesh. Its code is ORAI. It serves Orai city. The station consists of four platforms. The platforms are well sheltered. The station is a lies between Kanpur–Jhansi section and well connected to all over India and station comes under the "model railway station" category.

Trains 

The following trains run from Orai railway station:

 Mumbai LTT–Lucknow AC SF Special Fare Special
 Pune–Lucknow Express
 Bhopal–Lucknow Jn Special Fare Special
 Ahmedabad–Darbhanga Sabarmati Express
 Gorakhpur–Yesvantpur Express
 Barauni–Gwalior Mail
 Chennai–Lucknow Express
 Sabarmati Express
 Pratham Swatrantata Sangram Express
 Bhopal–Pratapgarh Express (via Lucknow)
 Chhapra–Mumbai CST Antyodaya Express
 Gorakhpur–Mumbai Antyodaya Express 
 Gorakhpur–Lokmanya Tilak Terminus Superfast Express
 Pune–Gorakhpur Express
 Lokmanya Tilak Terminus–Gorakhpur Express
 Gorakhpur–Secunderabad Express
 Indore–Rajendra Nagar Express (via Sultanpur)
 Indore–Rajendra Nagar Express (via Faizabad)
 Jhansi–Lucknow Jn. Intercity Express
 Jhansi–Kanpur Passenger (unreserved)
 Jhansi–Lucknow Passenger (unreserved)
 Kanpur–Valsad Udyog Karmi Express
 Kushinagar Express
 Lucknow Jn–Pune Express
 Mumbai LTT–Sultanpur Superfast Express 
 Panchvalley Passenger 
 Pushpak Express
 Raptisagar Express
 Gorakhpur–Panvel Express (via Barhni)
 Gorakhpur–Bandra Terminus Express (via Barhni)
 Gorakhpur–Lokmanya Tilak Terminus Express (via Barhni)

References

Railway stations in Jalaun district
Jhansi railway division
Orai